The 2011 Port Huron Predators season was the first season for the Continental Indoor Football League (CIFL) franchise. They were the first team in Port Huron since the Port Huron Pirates played there in 2007. On February 26, 2011, the Predators won their first game in franchise history, with a 69-12 victory over the visiting Indianapolis Enforcers. They got off to a quick start after a brief scare and never looked back. After the Enforcers brought back the opening kick-off to the Predators nine-yard line, the Port Huron defense stepped up and picked off the first play from scrimmage. It was the first of seven interceptions by the Predators' defense. On the next play, Predators back-up quarterback Jim Roth, who was filling in for Damon Dowdell, found Robert Height for a 41-yard score to put the team ahead for good. The Predators carried the 7-0 into the second quarter and led 21-6 at the half. In the second half, the flood gates opened as the Enforcers, a first-year team travel team, showed their inexperience with several mistakes. After several interceptions and fumbles, Port Huron took a commanding 47-6 lead into the third quarter before going on to win by the lopsided score. On March 28, the Predators fired their second coach of the season as well as their director of operations. Head Coach Jason Lovelock was let go after Brusate said, "The players wanted something different." As for Director of Operations, Julie Crankshaw, Brusate cited, "We had different ideas on what should be done. She was fired. She didn't live up to her contract; she didn't fulfill it. So there is no need to fulfill my end." Brusate appointed Offensive Coordinator, John Forti, as the Interim Head Coach. On April 2, Forti lead the team into his first game as Head Coach, and lead the team to a 29-45 defeat to the Chicago Knights, who hadn't won a game in over 2 season. The Predators announced on April 28, 2011 that they would be forfeiting the rest of the season.

Schedule

Standings

Roster

Stats

Passing

Rushing

Receiving

Regular season

Week 1: vs Indianapolis Enforcers

Week 2: vs Marion Blue Racers

Week 4: vs Dayton Silverbacks

Week 6: vs Chicago Knights

Week 7: vs Cincinnati Commandos

Week 8: vs Marion Blue Racers

Week 10: vs Indianapolis Enforcers

Week 12 vs Cincinnati Commandos

Week 14: vs Dayton Silverbacks

Week 15: vs Chicago Knights

References

2011 Continental Indoor Football League season
Port Huron Predators
American football in Michigan